WBAP is an AM news/talk radio station licensed to Fort Worth, Texas, and serving the Dallas-Fort Worth Metroplex. It is a Class A clear-channel station, using a non-directional antenna. Its nighttime signal can often be heard throughout the Southern, Central, and Midwestern states and Northern Mexico, while its daytime signal provides at least secondary coverage from Oklahoma City to Austin. The station's studios are located in the Victory Park district in Dallas just north of downtown. WBAP is one of the oldest radio stations in Texas, dating back to 1922, when stations in Texas were still given call signs beginning with "W" instead of "K."

, WBAP remains a top-rated news/talk station.

Emergency preparedness
WBAP and sister station KSCS are responsible for activation of the North Texas Emergency Alert System when hazardous weather alerts, Disaster area declarations, and child abductions are issued.

During a severe weather event on October 10, 2021, WBAP lost power along with much of its listening area. Brad Barton and several spotters had to broadcast its EAS and coverage via their 4G phones.

Station history
WBAP began broadcasting May 2, 1922 at a wavelength of 360 meters (about 833 kHz), changing to 400 meters (750 kHz) in August 1922. The station shared time with Dallas stations WFAA and WRR. It was the first station in the United States to have an audible logo signal similar to the NBC chimes, the WBAP cowbell. According to President Herbert Hoover, the station's call letters stood for "We Bring A Program," although in reality, the call letters were assigned sequentially, without any special meaning.

On May 15, 1923, the Federal Radio Commission expanded the broadcast band, and WBAP and WFAA moved to 476 meters (about 630 kHz). Another expansion moved WBAP to 600 kHz effective June 15, 1927, and this frequency was shared with WOAI in San Antonio. On November 11, 1928, WBAP moved to 800 kHz, and on June 1, 1929, WFAA also moved to 800 kHz, sharing time (and NBC Red network affiliation) with WBAP.  Station owner Amon G. Carter was unhappy with having to share time on 800 kHz with WFAA. Carter Publishing purchased KGKO in Wichita Falls (570 kHz) and moved it to Fort Worth as an affiliate of the NBC Blue network (which became ABC), and more importantly as a second frequency to be used when 800 kHz was not available. The sale was approved by the Federal Communications Commission September 24, 1935. On March 29, 1941, as a consequence of the Treaty of Havana, WBAP and WFAA moved one last time, to 820 kHz.

Carter eventually sold half of KGKO to A. H. Belo, owners of WFAA and the Dallas Morning News, and on April 27, 1947, KGKO was replaced by a second shared frequency between WBAP and WFAA.

On September 29, 1948, WBAP pioneered television service in Texas with the opening of the state's first video outlet, NBC-TV Network affiliate WBAP-TV (channel 5).  A year later, WBAP added an FM station at 100.5, WBAP-FM.  It moved to 96.3 MHz in 1955 and today is co-owned KSCS.

The dual frequency sharing arrangement between WBAP and WFAA continued through the 1950s and 1960s, with the stations switching frequencies several times a day. When WBAP changed frequencies, it signaled the change with a cowbell, which became widely associated with the station. Even though the stations swapped frequencies several times each day, the network affiliations remained constant: NBC network programming stayed on 820 kHz and ABC network programming stayed on 570 kHz. This frequently proved confusing for announcers and listeners alike.

On May 1, 1970, the unique dual split-frequency lives of WBAP and WFAA ended when WBAP paid $3.5 million to WFAA in exchange for sole occupancy of 820 kHz (and the NBC affiliation). WFAA took on 570 kHz (and the ABC affiliation), but with only 5,000 watts full-time. Once the frequency-sharing with WFAA ended in 1970, both stations were free to program musical formats, and WBAP began programming country music.  It also gained the added benefit of 820's clear-channel signal; previously WFAA controlled it during these prime nighttime hours.

Also around this time, the FCC began to scrutinize ownership of broadcast stations and print media in the same market with the tightening of its rules, which disallowed new radio and/or television combinations with newspapers while grandfathering existing instances. Carter Publications’ ownership of the Fort Worth Star-Telegram and WBAP-AM-FM-TV was one of three which existed in the Dallas/Fort Worth market. However, Carter voluntarily ended the cross-ownership issue in January 1973, when it announced the sale of all its Fort Worth media interests. WBAP and its FM sister (now known as KSCS), and the Star-Telegram were packaged to Capital Cities Communications for $64.5 million; LIN Broadcasting paid $35 million to acquire WBAP-TV, whose call letters were changed to KXAS-TV. The sales became final in the summer of 1974.

After a series of network affiliation changes in the late 1970s among WBAP, KRLD and WFAA, WBAP switched affiliations to ABC.

WBAP changed to a news/talk format in October 1993.  It was also the radio flagship radio station of the Texas Rangers.

Morning show host Hal Jay recently celebrated his 25-year anniversary with WBAP by organizing a charity fund-raising event for Cook Children's Hospital ("Hal Jay's Celebrity Roast").  Among those who attended were Baseball Hall-of-Famer Nolan Ryan and syndicated radio talk show host Sean Hannity.

On June 12, 2007, WBAP was one of many Disney/ABC Radio stations sold to Citadel Broadcasting. That same year, WBAP transmitted iBiquity HD Radio (digital) during the daytime and when not airing sports programming, until abruptly ending the "HD" digital transmission in early December 2008.  Because the license to broadcast digital "HD Radio" is perpetual, the station could resume digital broadcasts at any time.

For many years, WBAP was the flagship station for Dallas Stars hockey team, but relinquished the rights beginning in the 2009–2010 season, as on January 16, 2009, the Dallas Stars named KTCK Sportsradio 1310 The Ticket as its new flagship station for the next 5 years. Ironically, with Cumulus Media's recent acquisition of Citadel, WBAP and KTCK are now sister stations. Among the moments of when WBAP Had the stars, both Stanley Cup final runs were aired. And WBAP had the honor of broadcasting Game 6 of the 1999 Stanley Cup Finals, when the Stars clinched the Stanley Cup over Buffalo. 
 
Sister station KPMZ (later WBAP-FM, now KTCK-FM) started simulcasting WBAP on 96.7 FM, March 15, 2010. Although broadcasting on a rimshot signal, management claimed that WBAP-FM provides "crystal-clear FM fidelity" for their listeners within 96.7's pre-determined coverage area.

On October 7, 2013, Cumulus announced the discontinuation of the WBAP simulcast on 96.7 FM.  It switched call letters to KTCK-FM as a simulcast of the sports radio programming on KTCK (AM). Dan Bennet, the vice president/market manager of Cumulus, said he had "seen no ratings increase since adding the FM." Bennett added, "WBAP at 820 AM still covers 114 counties in the day and has been heard in up to 38 states at night and early morning before the sun comes up. WBAP at 820 is one of the biggest radio signals in America." The WBAP simulcast has moved to KPLX 99.5 HD2 (HD Radio needed), formerly The Ticket's radio spot.

In 2015, WBAP ended decades of ABC affiliation and changed its national news feed to Westwood One News. On August 31, 2020, after the shutdown of Westwood One News, WBAP switched its national news affiliation  to Fox News Radio.

Current programming

WBAP airs both local and nationally syndicated shows.  Weekdays begins with the WBAP Morning News with Hal Jay & Brian Estridge followed by Ernie Brown mid-mornings, Rick Roberts in the afternoon and Chris Krok evenings.  The syndicated shows come from the co-owned Westwood One Network: Dan Bongino, Mark Levin, Red Eye Radio and on weekends Jim Bohannon, Chris Plante and Ben Ferguson.  Weekends include shows on money, cars, home improvement, real estate and the outdoors. Brokered programming is also aired. Most hours on weekdays start with local news at the top of the hour while on nights and weekends, Fox News Radio is heard.

WBAP is the flagship station of Westwood One's nationally syndicated Red Eye Radio (formerly Midnight Trucking Radio Network), that traces its roots to Bill Mack's overnight show from 1969.  Hosts Eric Harley and Gary McNamara are heard live locally weeknights, with "Best Of" programs heard weekend overnights.

Prior to Citadel's takeover of the station in August 2007, talk show host Mark Davis's show was a full three hours, (9 A.M. to Noon).  As a result, Rush Limbaugh, Sean Hannity and Mark Levin were all forced to air on a one-hour tape delay.  However, with Citadel's ownership of the station, Davis's show was both cut in length and shifted back by a half-hour, to carry the top-rated talkers live. Davis departed the station in March 2012 when a contract agreement could not be reached.

In the fall of 2010, WBAP began an agreement with Texas Christian University to air live play-by-play of TCU Horned Frogs football and TCU Horned Frogs men's basketball.  The station carried every game of the undefeated football team in that first season.

References

External links
FCC History Cards for WBAP

 DFW Radio Archives
 DFW Radio/TV History

Hal Jay Celebrity Roast

News and talk radio stations in the United States
Radio stations established in 1922
µ
Cumulus Media radio stations
1922 establishments in Texas
Former subsidiaries of The Walt Disney Company
Clear-channel radio stations
Radio stations licensed before 1923 and still broadcasting